Mariano Tansini (10 August 1903 – 15 June 1968) was an Italian association football manager and footballer who played as a forward. He represented the Italy national football team twice, the first being on 21 March 1926, the occasion of a friendly match against Ireland in a 3–0 home win.

References

1903 births
1968 deaths
Italian footballers
Italy international footballers
Association football forwards
U.S. Cremonese players
Piacenza Calcio 1919 players
A.C. Milan players
S.S.C. Napoli players
Calcio Padova players
Serie A players
A.S.D. Fanfulla managers
Inter Milan managers